Slavik Galstyan also spelled as Slavik Galstian (born 21 December 1996) is an Armenian sport wrestler who competes in the men's Greco Roman category. He claimed the bronze medal in the men's 63 kg event during the 2019 World Wrestling Championships.

In March 2021, he competed at the European Qualification Tournament in Budapest, Hungary hoping to qualify for the 2020 Summer Olympics in Tokyo, Japan.

He competed in the 67 kg event at the 2022 World Wrestling Championships held in Belgrade, Serbia.

References

External links
 

1996 births
Living people
Armenian male sport wrestlers
World Wrestling Championships medalists
21st-century Armenian people